Impi Lydia Lukkarinen (17 May 1918, Äänekoski - 21 January 2010) was a Finnish journalist and politician. At first she was a member of the Social Democratic Party of Finland and, after 1959, of the Social Democratic Union of Workers and Smallholders. She served as a Member of Parliament (21 July 1951 - 22 March 1970).

References 

1918 births
2010 deaths
People from Äänekoski
Social Democratic Party of Finland politicians
Social Democratic Union of Workers and Smallholders politicians
Members of the Parliament of Finland (1951–54)
Members of the Parliament of Finland (1954–58)
Members of the Parliament of Finland (1958–62)
Members of the Parliament of Finland (1962–66)
Members of the Parliament of Finland (1966–70)
Women members of the Parliament of Finland